Jawad Ouaddouch (born October 4, 1981) is a Moroccan footballer. He usually plays in Attack. Ouaddouch is currently attached to FAR Rabat.

References

 

1981 births
Living people
Moroccan footballers
Morocco international footballers
Emirates Club players
People from Kasba Tadla
Botola players
UAE Pro League players
Association footballers not categorized by position